Leinelä railway station is a Helsinki commuter rail station located in Leinelä, one of the newest neighbourhoods in the city of Vantaa, Finland. 

It is one of the new stations of the Ring Rail Line (Kehärata), which opened in July 2015. The station is located between the stations of Hiekkaharju and Lentoasema (Helsinki Airport).

References

Railway stations in Vantaa
Railway stations opened in 2015
2015 establishments in Finland